Live at the 'It Club'  is a live album by  Gene Harris and The Three Sounds which was recorded in California in 1970 but not released on the Blue Note label until 1996.

Reception

Allmusic's Stephen Thomas Erlewine noted, "Live At the "It Club" shows the Three Sounds pulling out funky, gritty rhythms out of their basic bluesy hard-bop sound. The group's funky influences are most noticeable in the rhythm section of drummer Carl Burnette and bassist Henry Franklin, who had been playing with Harris for only a short time when this set was recorded. The rhythm section pushes Harris, making the music loose and swinging -- the groove matters more than anything on the album. Occasionally, the energy of the Three Sounds lags, but Live at the "It Club" is an enjoyable piece of grooving soul-jazz".

Track listing
All compositions by Gene Harris except where noted
 "Funky Pullett" (Monk Higgins) − 7:40
 "I'm Still Sad" − 8:45
 "On Green Dolphin Street" (Bronisław Kaper, Ned Washington) − 7:20 Additional track on CD release
 "Baby Man" (Higgins) − 5:20
 "Love for Sale" (Cole Porter) − 8:00
 "Sittin' Duck" (Higgins) − 7:30
 "Tammy's Breeze" − 5:40 Additional track on CD release
 "John Brown's Body" (Traditional) − 8:00 Additional track on CD release

Personnel
Gene Harris − piano
Henry Franklin − bass
Carl Burnett − drums

References

1996 live albums
The Three Sounds live albums
Blue Note Records live albums
Albums produced by Monk Higgins